{{Infobox television
| image                = Boston-med TV series.jpg
| caption              =
| alt_name             = 
| genre                = Documentary
| creator              = 
| developer            = 
| writer               = 
| director             = 
| creative_director    = 
| starring             = 
| voices               = 
| narrated             = 
| theme_music_composer = Matthew Puckett
| opentheme            = Everything I Want
| endtheme             = 
| composer             = 
| country              = United States
| language             = English
| num_seasons          = 1
| num_episodes         = 8
| list_episodes        = 
| executive_producer   = Rudy BednarTerence Wrong
| producer             = Erica Baumgart, Monica DelaRosa, Brian Flatley, Andy Genovese, Sarah Namias
| editor               = Pagan Harleman, Faith Jones, Cindy Kaplan Rooney
| location             = 
| cinematography       = 
| camera               = 
| runtime              = 42 minutes
| company              = ABC News
| channel              = ABC
| picture_format       = 
| audio_format         =
| first_aired          = 
| last_aired           = 
| related              = 

Boston Med is an eight-part documentary television series that premiered on ABC in the United States on June 24, 2010. It follows the stories of doctors, nurses, patients and their families at Mass General, Brigham and Women's and Children's. The series was filmed over a four-month period, and edited for a year before airing.  It is produced by ABC News with assistance from local ABC affiliate  WCVB.

Synopsis
The series follows the professional and personal lives of the doctors and nurses working in three of Boston's best hospitals: Brigham & Women's, Children's Hospital Boston, and Massachusetts General Hospital.

An episode follows the doctors' and nurses' struggles with their personal life and how to save their patients.

Reception
Boston Med is scored 87 out of 100 on the review aggregator website Metacritic based on 14 critical reviews, which the site describes as "universal acclaim".

The series was nominated for and won several awards:
 2011 Emmy for Outstanding Editing (Nominated)
 2012 CINE Special Jury Award
 2012 CINE Golden Eagle Award	
 2012 CINE Master Series Award candidate
 2011 The Donate Life Hollywood Inspire Awards

References

External links
 archived from https://web.archive.org/web/20100811003823/http://bostonmed.abcnews.go.com/

2010 American television series debuts
2010s American documentary television series
2010 American television series endings
American Broadcasting Company original programming
2010s American television miniseries
English-language television shows
2010s American medical television series
Television shows set in Boston
Television shows filmed in Boston